A surveyor (land surveyor) is a professional who determines positions on or near the Earth's surface.

Surveyor may also refer to:

Professions and their activities
 Marine surveyor or "ship surveyor", someone who inspects and examines ships
 Quantity surveyor, someone who controls costs on construction projects
 Pollster, someone who conducts surveys or opinion polls
 Surveyor General, an official responsible for government surveying in a specific country or territory

Ships
 NOAAS Surveyor (S 132), a National Oceanic and Atmospheric Administration survey ship in service from 1960 to 1995 or 1996
 USC&GS Surveyor, the name of more than one ship of the United States Coast and Geodetic Survey
 , an armed steamer in commission in the United States Navy from 1917 to 1919

Other uses
 Surveyor (typeface), a Didone classification serif typeface 
 Surveyor, Pennsylvania, a community in the United States
 The Surveyors, a 1972 Swiss film
 Surveyor magazine, a British professional weekly
 Surveyor program, a series of unmanned spaceflights to the Moon

See also
 Survey (disambiguation)